Giuseppe Sanmartino or Giuseppe Sammartino (1720 – 1793) was an Italian sculptor during the Rococo period.

Sanmartino was born in Naples. His first dated (1753) work is Veiled Christ or Christ lying under the Shroud, commissioned initially from the Venetian sculptor Antonio Corradini who did not live to complete the work. Sammartino interpreted his sketches freely to create a masterly sculpture which can be seen in Sansevero Chapel (also called Cappella Sansevero or Pietatella) in Naples. Other contributors to this chapel were Francesco Celebrano and the Genoese sculptor Francesco Queirolo.

The statue of Veiled Christ is elaborately artificial (art historian Wittkower labeled it as a hypertrophic effort) by reproducing in stone the effect of a thin veil. In the same chapel, Corradini's antecedent statue of Chastity (also called Modesty) is present. Innocenzo Spinazzi, a contemporary Florentine sculptor, also completed statues with this effect.

Successful completion of this commission earned Sammartino further commissions. These included the group of St. Augustine in the Neapolitan church of Sant'Agostino alla Zecca, the decoration of the Annunziata church, and the monument to Prince Filippo of Naples, Duke of Calabria in the Basilica of Santa Chiara. He also executed a series of nativity scenes.

References

Sources

External links
 Web Gallery of Art

1720 births
1793 deaths
18th-century Neapolitan people
Italian Baroque sculptors
Italian male sculptors
Rococo sculptors